András Törő (born July 10, 1940) is an American sprint canoer who competed from the early 1960s to the mid-1970s. Competing in four Summer Olympics, he won a bronze medal in the C-2 1000 m event at Rome in 1960.

Törő defected from Hungary during the 1964 Summer Olympics in Tokyo. Earning his degree from the University of Michigan, he went to work as a naval architect and marine engineer. Becoming an American citizen in 1971, Törő competed for the United States in two more Summer Olympics, earning his best finish of sixth in the semifinal event of the C-1 1000 m event at Munich in 1972.

In 2022, Törő received the U.S. Olympic & Paralympic Committee's Olympic & Paralympic Torch Award in recognition of his contributions to the Olympic movement.

See also
 List of Eastern Bloc defectors

References

Sports-reference.com profile

1940 births
American male canoeists
21st-century American engineers
Canoeists at the 1960 Summer Olympics
Canoeists at the 1964 Summer Olympics
Canoeists at the 1972 Summer Olympics
Canoeists at the 1976 Summer Olympics
Hungarian male canoeists
Hungarian defectors
Living people
Olympic canoeists of Hungary
Olympic canoeists of the United States
Olympic bronze medalists for Hungary
University of Michigan alumni
Olympic medalists in canoeing
Defectors to the United States
Medalists at the 1960 Summer Olympics